Fernando Jacinto Quissanga, known as Nandinho (born 25 May 1998) is an Angolan professional footballer who plays as a centre-back for Interclube.

Club career
On 28 November 2016, he signed a contract with the Russian Premier League club FC Rostov.

In August 2020, Nandinho signed with Interclube, joining from league rivals Progresso do Sambizanga.

International career
He made his debut for the Angola national football team on 12 June 2016 in a 2016 COSAFA Cup game against Malawi. He played his first continental-level competitive game for Angola on 11 November 2016 in an Africa Cup of Nations qualifier against Madagascar.

Personal
His older brother Bastos is also a professional footballer, currently with FC Rostov.

References

External links
 

1998 births
Living people
Angolan footballers
Angola international footballers
Angolan expatriate footballers
Expatriate footballers in Russia
Angolan expatriate sportspeople in Russia
Kabuscorp S.C.P. players
FC Rostov players
Association football defenders
Progresso Associação do Sambizanga players
G.D. Interclube players